Knipowitschia radovici, the Norin goby, is a species of goby endemic to Croatia where it only occurs in the drainage basin of the Neretva River, where adults inhabit the deepest parts of the rivers (down to ) in the strongest current (juveniles are found in shallower waters).  This species can reach a length of  SL. The specific name honours the Ornithologist Dragan Radović, a friend of the author, Marcelo Kovačić, who encouraged him to sample in the waterbodies of Croatia.

References

Norin goby
Freshwater fish of Europe
Endemic fauna of Croatia
Fish described in 2005
Endemic fish of the Neretva basin
Fish of Bosnia and Herzegovina